Portage is a town in Box Elder County, Utah, United States. The population was 245 at the 2010 census. The town received its name from Mormon apostle Lorenzo Snow. He named it Portage after his birthplace of Portage County, Ohio.

Geography
Portage is located near the northeast corner of Box Elder County, with its northern border following the Utah-Idaho state line. It is in the Malad Valley, west of Interstate 15 on former State Route 90.

Climate
This climatic region is typified by large seasonal temperature differences, with warm to hot (and often humid) summers and cold (sometimes severely cold) winters.  According to the Köppen Climate Classification system, Portage has a humid continental climate, abbreviated "Dfb" on climate maps.

Demographics

As of the census of 2000, there were 257 people, 75 households, and 62 families residing in the town. The population density was 112.6 people per square mile (43.5/km2). There were 83 housing units at an average density of 36.4 per square mile (14.1/km2). The racial makeup of the town was 98.83% White, and 1.17% from two or more races. Hispanic or Latino of any race were 5.45% of the population.

There were 75 households, out of which 46.7% had children under the age of 18 living with them, 73.3% were married couples living together, 4.0% had a female householder with no husband present, and 17.3% were non-families. 14.7% of all households were made up of individuals, and 8.0% had someone living alone who was 65 years of age or older. The average household size was 3.43 and the average family size was 3.84.

In the town, the population was spread out, with 39.7% under the age of 18, 5.4% from 18 to 24, 23.7% from 25 to 44, 20.2% from 45 to 64, and 10.9% who were 65 years of age or older. The median age was 30 years. For every 100 females, there were 90.4 males. For every 100 females age 18 and over, there were 101.3 males.

The median income for a household in the town was $43,125, and the median income for a family was $48,333. Males had a median income of $45,417 versus $24,688 for females. The per capita income for the town was $13,257. About 1.7% of families and 8.7% of the population were below the poverty line, including 13.1% of those under the age of 18 and none of those 65 or over.

Ancestries: English (28.8%), Danish (16.3%), German (16.3%), Scottish (10.9%), Norwegian (7.4%), Welsh (5.1%).

See also

 List of cities and towns in Utah

References

External links

 Official website

Towns in Box Elder County, Utah
Towns in Utah
Populated places established in 1867